The 2009–10 Danish Superliga season was the 20th season of the Danish Superliga league championship, which determinates the winners of the Danish football championship. It is governed by the Danish Football Association. The tournament started on 18 July 2009 and concluded on 16 May 2010.

The Danish champions qualify for 2010–11 UEFA Champions League qualification. Runners-up and 3rd placed team qualify for 2010–11 UEFA Europa League qualification. The 11th and 12th placed teams will be relegated to the 1st Division. The 1st Division champions and runners-up will be promoted to the Superliga.

On 5 May 2010, FC Copenhagen (FC København) won the title for the eighth time in 17 years after defeating HB Køge 4–0.

Participants

League table

Results

Matchday 1–11

Matchday 12–33

Goals
Source: DBU

Top goalscorers

Own goals
Allan K. Jepsen (Randers) for Brøndby (17 August 2009)
Jim Larsen (Silkeborg) for AGF (22 August 2009)
Nicklas Svendsen (HB Køge) for Odense (20 September 2009)
Nicklas Svendsen (HB Køge) for Odense (20 September 2009) 
Mikkel Vendelbo (Esbjerg) for AGF (28 September 2009)
Anders Egholm (SønderjyskE) for AGF (3 October 2009)
Nenad Novaković (Nordsjælland) for Brøndby (4 October 2009)
Winston Reid (Midtjylland) for AGF (31 October 2009)
Jens Gjesing (AGF) for Midtjylland (31 October 2009)
Jens Gjesing (AGF) for HB Køge (7 November 2009)
Jim Larsen (Silkeborg) for Odense (7 November 2009)
Kevin Conboy (Esbjerg) for Brøndby (8 November 2009)
Kian Hansen (Esbjerg) for Nordsjælland (21 March 2010)
Anders Østli (SønderjyskE) for Copenhagen (21 March 2010)
Kasper Bøgelund (AaB) for Randers FC (5 May 2010)
Jakob Poulsen (AGF) for SønderjyskE (6 May 2010)
Mikkel Bischoff (Brøndby IF) for Randers FC (16 May 2010)

Hat-tricks

Season statistics

Scoring
 First goal of the season: Stephan Petersen for Nordsjælland against Copenhagen (18 July 2009)
 Fastest goal in a match: Peter Graulund (16 seconds) for AGF against AaB (20 July 2009)
 Widest Winning Margin: Copenhagen 7–1 HB Køge (25 July 2009)
 Most Goals in a Match: Brøndby 6–3 Nordsjælland (4 October 2009)
 First hat-trick of the season: Rajko Lekic for Silkeborg against Midtjylland (26 July 2009)

Cards
 First yellow card: Benjamin Kibebe for Nordsjælland against Copenhagen (18 July 2009)
 First red card: Tim Janssen for Esbjerg against Brøndby (26 July 2009)
 Fastest red card in a match: Johan Absalonsen (55 minutes) for OB against AGF (3 August 2009)

Attendances
Source: DanskFodbold.com

Venues 
The Danish Football Association has listed a number of requirements to the venues hosting Superliga football. These include a minimum capacity of 10,000, hereof at least 3,000 seats. Further is under-soil heating a demand. It is possible for a club to get dispensation for some of the requirements for a year, after promotion to the league.

Managerial changes

 Did not become official until date he gained his P-licence. Frank Andersen briefly served as interim manager.

See also
2009–10 in Danish football

References

External links
  Danish FA

Danish Superliga seasons
1
Denmark